Myrna Joy "Jody" Miller (November 29, 1941 – October 6, 2022) was an American country music singer. Her biggest hit singles were "Queen of the House" and "Home of the Brave". She is a recipient of the Grammy Award for Best Female Country Vocal Performance in 1966.

Early life
Miller was born in Phoenix, Arizona, on November 29, 1941. She was the youngest of five sisters. Her father worked as a mechanic.  Miller grew up in Los Angeles, before relocating to Blanchard, Oklahoma, when she was eight years old to live with her grandmother after her parents divorced.  She attended Blanchard High School, graduating in 1959.

Career
The actor, Dale Robertson, introduced Miller to Capitol Records, after Miller had begun her career in the early 1960s as a folk/pop singer, singing in the Los Angeles area and appearing on Tom Paxton's television series. She released her first album on Capitol in 1964 and had a modest pop hit that year with "He Walks Like a Man" in the US.

In 1965, Miller participated in the Sanremo Festival as a team companion of Pino Donaggio. Since the Festival was created as a composers' competition, Miller and Donaggio presented differently arranged versions of the entry "Io che non vivo (senza te)". The song came in at No. 7 and was only a moderate hit, until Dusty Springfield recorded an English version in 1966 which was eventually released as "You Don't Have to Say You Love Me". Also in 1965, Miller released an answer record to Roger Miller's blockbuster hit "King of the Road", titled "Queen of the House" (which became her signature hit, peaking at number 12 on the Billboard Hot 100 and at number 5 on the country singles chart). Miller won the Grammy Award for Best Female Country Vocal Performance for the song in 1966.

Miller scored a second top 40 pop hit that year with "Home of the Brave", a No. 25 Hot 100 hit, that was historically significant for tackling the issue of non-conformity and tolerance. The theme prevented it from making headway in the more socially conservative country chart in 1965. By the mid-1960s, Miller became a pioneer crossover female vocalist, opening the doors for Linda Ronstadt, Anne Murray, and Olivia Newton-John, and others as a pop singer recording a strong country influence and finding success in both genres. Miller's pop success petered out by the late 1960s. Tammy Wynette's record producer, Billy Sherrill, was a fan of Miller. He signed her to Epic Records in 1970 to record specifically for the country market. She had two more country hits, with "Look At Mine" nearly making the Top 20, and a Top 20 hit with "If You Think I Love You Now (I Just Started)" in early 1971. She recorded a remake of the Chiffons 1963 hit "He's So Fine", which hit the top 5 on the country chart and No. 53 on the pop chart that summer, garnering another Grammy Award nomination.

Several major country hits followed, many of them remakes of pop/rock classics such as "Baby I'm Yours," "Be My Baby," and "To Know Him Is to Love Him". Among the new country songs she had hits with were the top tens "There's a Party Goin' On," "Good News," and "Darling, You Can Always Come Back Home."  In the mid-1970s she had smaller hits with both new songs like "Reflections" (not the Diana Ross and the Supremes hit) and cover versions of pop hits like "House of the Rising Sun", a hit for The Animals, and "(You Make Me Feel Like) A Natural Woman", the Aretha Franklin hit. Miller's last top 30 country hit was 1977's "When the New Wears Off Our Love," and two years later she made her final chart appearance.

Later years
Miller went into semi-retirement in the 1980s, during which time she and her husband, Monty Brooks, owned a ranch in Oklahoma.  She later emerged as a Christian music artist, releasing several albums in that genre.  In 1999, the Country Gospel Music Association inducted Miller into its Hall of Fame, along with Loretta Lynn, Barbara Mandrell, Andy Griffith, David L. Cook and Lulu Roman.  Miller and her daughter Robin recorded and toured together for a period of time. Miller continued to perform live and sing her secular hits as well as her gospel material.

Miller died on October 6, 2022, in Blanchard.  She was 80, and suffered from Parkinson's disease in the seven years prior to her death.

Discography

References

External links
The Official Jody Miller website
Jody Miller website
Jody Miller music
 [  AllMusic]
 
 
"In the Spotlight with Jody Miller" hosted by Jennifer McMullen. A one-hour monthly internet radio program streaming worldwide, devoted to the music of Jody Miller: 3:00 – 4:00pm NYT, with rebroadcasts as per the program schedule.

1941 births
2022 deaths
American country singer-songwriters
American women country singers
American gospel singers
Capitol Records artists
Country musicians from Oklahoma 
Deaths from Parkinson's disease
Epic Records artists
Grammy Award winners
People from Blanchard, Oklahoma
Singer-songwriters from Oklahoma
Stephen F. Austin High School (Houston, Texas) alumni
21st-century American women